Paul Snow-Hansen (born 3 September 1990, in Takapuna) is a New Zealand sailor. In 2016, he sailed in the 470 World Championships in San Isidro, Buenos Aires where he won a silver medal with Daniel Willcox.

He was a competitor in the 470 class at the 2012 Summer Olympics with Jason Saunders. He competed with Daniel Willcox at the 2016 Summer Olympics. In 2021, Snow-Hansen and Willcox won the open men's 470 European Championship, sailed off Vilamoura in Portugal.

Of Māori descent, Snow-Hansen affiliates to the Ngāpuhi iwi.

References

External links
 
 Paul Snow-Hansen at Yachting New Zealand

1990 births
Living people
New Zealand male sailors (sport)
Olympic sailors of New Zealand
Sailors at the 2012 Summer Olympics – 470
Sailors at the 2016 Summer Olympics – 470
Ngāpuhi people
New Zealand Māori sportspeople
New Zealand sportsmen
Sailors at the 2020 Summer Olympics – 470
People from Takapuna